Richwood is an unincorporated community and census-designated place (CDP) located in Gloucester County, New Jersey, United States, that is split between Harrison Township (with 3,400 of the CDP's residents) and Mantua Township (with 59 of the total). As of the 2020 United States census, the CDP’s population was 3,577, an increase of 118 (+3.4%) from the 3,459 enumerated at the 2010 U.S. census.

Geography
According to the United States Census Bureau, the CDP had a total area of 8.910 square miles (23.077 km2), including 8.850 square miles (22.921 km2) of land and 0.060 square miles (0.157 km2) of water (0.68%).

Demographics

Census 2010

Transportation
Exit 50B on Route 55 is about a half mile from the center of Richwood. The exit provides access to Richwood, via U.S. Route 322. Rowan University in nearby Glassboro is about 1¼ miles from Richwood.

See also
Richwood Methodist Church

References

Census-designated places in Gloucester County, New Jersey
Harrison Township, New Jersey